D13 may refer to:
 , an Almirante Brown-class destroyer of the Argentine Navy
 Dublin 13, a postal district in Ireland
 Fokker D.XIII, a Dutch fighter aircraft 
 General Flores (ship), an Almirante Clemente-class destroyer of the Venezuelan Navy
 LNER Class D13, an English 4-4-0 steam tender locomotive
 Pennsylvania Railroad class D13, an American 4-4-0 steam locomotive; see Pennsylvania Railroad locomotive classification
 D13 series of Honda D engines
 D13, a bald eagle from the 2012 clutch of the Decorah Bald Eagles